Mythos is a Canadian new age musical project started by Bob D'Eith and Paul Schmidt in 1996. Bob (piano) and Paul (guitar) collectively wrote, produced, and performed on the albums with the help of various session performers. The centerpiece of the Mythos sound rests on the acoustic guitar and piano, which are accented by guest vocalists. Synthesizers and performances in various other musical styles are regularly incorporated into the music.

History
Robert (Bob) D'Eith attended the University of Victoria in the 1980s, receiving both a Bachelor of Arts (BA) and a Bachelor of Law (LLB) from this institution. Before creating Mythos, he played keyboards in Rock band Rymes with Orange, and contributed to the scores of a number of film and television productions. Throughout his musical career, he also maintained a private legal practice in Entertainment Law, and currently holds the titles of President for Adagio Music (Mythos' label, formerly "Spark"), and Executive Director of Music BC.

D'Eith and Schmidt formed Mythos in 1995. Mythos' initial releases, Introspection and Iridescence, were on D'Eith's Spark Records and were confined to the Canadian market. The success of these albums led to Mythos' distribution by the Higher Octave label, who first released an eponymous album containing mostly songs from prior releases. This release was commercially successful, peaking at 18 on the Billboard Top New Age Albums chart. Higher Octave went on to release two more studio albums by the group, both of which placed on the Billboard chart. Higher Octave has been restructured multiple times in the past few years by its parent labels, Narada and EMI. The most recent Mythos album, Purity, is being distributed by Pacific Music and Alula Records. In 2010, Mythos released Rain, a remixed version of Wind (from Introspection), in celebration of the group's 15 year anniversary.

In 2013, Mythos released "Journey" on Adagio Music/The Orchard, followed in 2015 with a special 20th Anniversary Vinyl Best of Mythos collection. August 3, 2018 Mythos released the EP "Eros" on Adagio Music/The Orchard. In 2021, Mythos released a 25th Anniversary Album "XXV" featuring 5 new tracks and 9 fully remastered classics.

Musical style
Critics have described Mythos as New Age, Ambient, Ethereal, and Film-Oriented, with influences from Jazz, Classical, Gospel-Soul, and various World styles. Many of their songs include vocalize performances, but few have lyrics. The music is multi-layered, incorporating synthesizers and a numerous acoustic instruments. Multiple guest artists and/or session musicians have contributed to each of Mythos' studio releases, most prominently husband and wife pair Rene Worst (bass) and Jennifer Scott (vocals).

Awards and nominations
Mythos was nominated for Juno Instrumental Artist of the Year award in 1998.
Bob D'Eith was nominated for the Canadian Music Awards' Best Keyboardist of the Year in 1995.
Individual albums have won and been nominated for various awards, as described in the Discography.

Discography

Introspection

Track listing
"Wind" - 4:00
"November" - 4:58
"Angels Weep" - 8:33
"Paradox" - 4:42
"Premonition" - 4:09
"Cathedral" - 4:32
"The Nile" - 4:01
"Clockwork" - 4:45
"Sirens" - 3:29
"Prelude" - 2:36
"Introspection" - 4:01
"November [Remix]" - 5:32

Awards
Winner West Coast Music Award Best Dance Album

Performance Credits
Bob D'Eith: Piano, Keyboards
Paul Schmidt: Guitar
Christine Duncan: Vocals
Jennifer Scott: Vocals
Rene Worst: Bass

Angels Weep

Track listing
"Angels Weep (Radio Edit)" - 3:42
"Angels Dance (Remix)" - 3:33
"November (Radio Edit)" - 3:15
"November Dance (Remix Edit)" - 3:26
"The Nile (Bonus Track)" - 4:00

Iridescence

Track listing
"Loneliness" - 3:38
"Sunless Sea" - 4:01
"Iridescence" - 4:15
"Planinata" - 3:28
"Brazil" - 4:15
"La Cathedral" - 1:59
"Sacred River" - 3:05
"Evolution" - 5:08
"June" - 5:07
"Motif" - 2:47
"Danse Plantania" - 3:31
"Sacred River [Remix]" - 3:01
"Angels Dance" - 3:32

Performance Credits
Bob D'Eith: Piano, Keyboards
Paul Schmidt: Guitar
Annette Ducharme: Vocals
Christine Duncan: Vocals
Niko Quintal: Percussion
Jennifer Scott: Vocals
Rene Worst: Bass

Mythos

Background
This is Mythos' debut on the Higher Octave label, consisting mostly of previously released material. The liner notes claim this release includes "the best of the previously released album Introspection plus seven new tracks," but a number of the remaining songs were included on Iridescence. The track name "The Odyssey" does not seem to appear prior to this eponymous album, but it actually is the track "Catheral" on Introspection.

Track listing
"Brazil" - 4:17
"June" - 5:01
"Sunless Sea" - 3:59
"November" - 4:57
"Planinata" - 3:26
"La Cathedral" - 2:03
"The Odyssey" - 4:31
"Angels Weep" - 5:36
"The Nile" - 4:02
"Motif" - 2:49
"Sirens" - 3:31
"Prelude" - 2:36
"Introspection" - 4:01
"Evolution" - 5:11
"Premonition" - 2:58
"Paradox" - 4:46

Charting

The Reality of a Dreamer

Track listing
"Alchemy" - 4:38
"Kaleidoscope" - 3:30
"Venice" - 4:28
"Vision I" - 3:22
"Requiem" - 4:37
"Solstice" - 4:06
"Fantasy" - 3:24
"Destiny" - 3:42
"Reveries" - 1:28
"The Ring" - 3:24
"Redemption" - 3:33
"Vision II" - 3:24

Awards
Nominated for the West Coast Music Award Best Electronic (Techno, House) Release

Charting

Eternity

Track listing
"Ascent" - 3:39
"Unity" - 4:21
"Del Mar" - 3:42
"Turn to Grey" - 3:56
"Alpha" - 2:48
"Exodus" - 4:39
"Leyenda" - 1:51
"Kyrie" - 4:35
"Dreams of Jade" - 5:28
"Paradise" - 3:46
"Orca" - 5:48
"Sixth Sense" - 2:35
"Freedom" - 4:02

Awards
This album won Western Canadian Music Award for "Best Instrumental Album" in 2003

Charting

Purity

Track listing
"Purity" - 4:34
"Surrender" - 5:51
"Alten Mara" - 3:18
"Andalucia" - 4:03
"Icarus" - 4:38
"Adagio" - 2:35
"Mizo's Gift" - 5:13
"Deus Ex Machina" - 5:46
"Dream" - 4:53
"Mystique" - 3:51
"Triste" - 5:23

Performance Credits
Bob D'Eith: Piano and Keyboards
Paul Schmidt: Acoustic Guitar
Jennifer Scott: Vocals
Rene Worst: Bass
Pepe Danza: Additional Percussion, Ethnic Flutes, and Stringed Instruments
Cameron Wilson: Violin
Finn Maniche: Cello

Singles

"November Dance"
"Danse Planinata"
"Kaleidoscope"
"Angels Dance"
"Ascent"
"Rain"

Journey

Track listing
"Journey" - 4:38
"Spiritus" - 4:47
"Escape Velocity" - 5:46
"Tokyo" - 5:12
"Inner Peace" - 3:01
"April" - 2:43
"Novaya Zemlya" - 4:02
"Nepal" - 3:40
"Duet" - 4:34
"Nocturnal" - 1:38
"Impressionism" - 3:48

Performance Credits
Bob D'Eith: Piano and Keyboards
Paul Schmidt: Acoustic Guitar
Jasmin Parkin: Vocals

Eros

Track listing
"Kawakari" - 4:30
"Eros" - 4:49
"Catana" - 4:17
"Allure" - 4:35
"Song from a Sad Dream" - 3:36

Performance Credits
Bob D'Eith: Piano and Keyboards
Paul Schmidt: Acoustic Guitar
Jennifer Scott: Vocals
Rene Worst: Bass

XXV

Track listing
"Legacy (feat. Cam Blake)" - 5:02
"Fly Away" - 4:39
"Bonum et Malum" - 4:10
"Progression" - 4:52
"Recuerdos de la Alahambra" - 2:44
"November Dance (2021 Remastered Version)" - 3:28
"Brazil (2021 Remastered Version)" - 4:17
"Planinata (2021 Remastered Version)" - 3:26
"Alchemy (2021 Remastered Version)" - 4:39
"Ascent (2021 Remastered Version)." - 3:40
"Icarus (2021 Remastered Version)" - 4:40
"Surrender (2021 Remastered Version)" - 5:51
"Eros (2021 Remastered Version)" - 4:48
"Spiritus (2021 Remastered Version)" - 4:47

Performance Credits
Bob D'Eith: Piano and Keyboards
Paul Schmidt: Acoustic Guitar
Jennifer Scott: Vocals
Rene Worst: Bass

See also 
List of ambient music artists

Notes

References
 Juno Awards
 Xdot25
 Review of Introspection
 Earth Rhythms
 
 Bob D'Eith CV
 Bob D'Eith profile

External links
 Official website
 Music BC

Canadian electronic music groups
Musical groups from Vancouver
Musical groups established in 1995
New-age musicians
1995 establishments in British Columbia